The United Nations General Assembly Resolution 2625, "The Declaration on Principles of International Law concerning Friendly Relations and Co-operation among States" was adopted by the General Assembly on 24 October 1970, during a commemorative session to celebrate the twenty-fifth anniversary of the United Nations. The Declaration worked out the most authoritative and comprehensive formulation so far of the principle of self-determination.

According to this document "the principle of equal rights and self-determination of peoples enshrined in the Charter of the United Nations" embraces the right of all peoples "freely to determine, without external interference, their political status and to pursue their economic, social and cultural development" as well as the duty of every State "to respect this right in accordance with the provisions of the Charter". It further added that "the establishment of a sovereign and independent State, the free association or integration with an independent State, or the emergence into any other political status freely determined by a people constitute modes of implementing the right of self-determination", thus stressing, as the critical issue, the methods of reaching the decision and not the result.

References

2625
1970 in law